Vexillum luculentum is a species of small sea snail, marine gastropod mollusk in the family Costellariidae, the ribbed miters.

Description
The length of the shell varies between 8 mm and 15 mm.

Distribution
This marine species occurs from the Philippines to Fiji and Samoa.

References

External links
 Reeve, L. A. (1844-1845). Monograph of the genus Mitra. In: Conchologia Iconica, or, illustrations of the shells of molluscous animals, vol. 2, pl. 1-39 and unpaginated text. L. Reeve & Co., London.
 W.O.Cernohorsky, The Mitridae of Fiji - The Veliger v. 8 (1965-1966)

luculentum
Gastropods described in 1845